Nilesh Narayan Rane is an Indian Politician. He is from Maharshtra, a state in Western India.

Personal Life
Nilesh is son of union cabinet minister Narayan Rane. His brother, Nitesh Narayan Rane, represents Kankavli constituency in Maharashtra Legislative Assembly.

Political Career 
Nilesh Rane was elected to 15th Lok Sabha of India from Ratnagiri-Sindhudurg constituency of Maharashtra as a member of Indian National Congress (INC).

As part of the 15th Lok Sabha, Rane served on the Committee on Home Affairs and the Rules Committee.

Rane contested from same constituency for a seat in 16th Lok Sabha, but lost to Sena's candidate Vinayak Raut.

As of 2019 he is a member of Bharatiya Janta Party (BJP).

Arrests

In 2013, Rane was arrested for vandalising a toll booth in Goa.

In 2016, Rane was arrested for abduction of Congress Taluka president from Chiplun who alleged that he was kidnapped, assaulted and confined inside a locked room by Rane and his party men for missing the Maratha meet.

References

1981 births
Living people
India MPs 2009–2014
Indian National Congress politicians
Marathi politicians
Maharashtra politicians
Lok Sabha members from Maharashtra
People from Sindhudurg district